Aaron Rose Philip (pronounced A-ron, born March 15, 2001) is an Antiguan-American model.  In 2018, she became the first black, transgender, and physically disabled model to ever be represented by a major modeling agency and has since modeled in several major high fashion photo shoots and campaigns. In 2021, Philip debuted as an exclusive for Moschino’s spring/summer 2022 fashion show - making her the first model using a wheelchair to walk for a major luxury fashion brand.

Career 
In 2016 at age 14, Philip published a memoir called This Kid Can Fly: It's About Ability (Not Disability) detailing her experiences growing up with cerebral palsy. The book was co-written with Tanya Bolden and published by HarperCollins.

Philip was a high school junior when she decided to pursue modeling. She was discovered through her social media where she took notice of the lack of representation of trans women of color within the fashion industry, let alone anyone with a disability.

Philip has actively worked towards an inclusive industry via her editorial features in W, i-D, Dazed, ELLE, Allure, and Paper magazines, and also on Refinery29 and Now This. In 2018, Philip was also subject to a profile in The New York Times, hailing Philip's career as a sign of a more diverse industry. Vogue (magazine) recently featured and photographed Aaron with her friend, Chella Man, discussing the lack of disabled representation.

Philip has graced the cover of Paper magazine's "Pride" issue, interviewed by supermodel Naomi Campbell. She's also graced the September Issue cover of S moda for El Pais and the Spring/ Summer 21 cover of INDIE. Philip has shot editorials for American Vogue, British Vogue, and Vogue Italia, and has appeared in campaigns for Dove, Sephora, Outdoor Voices, and Nike. Philip starred in the music video for Miley Cyrus' song '"Mother's Daughter," which received over 100 million views to date.

Philip made her first runway appearance in 2019 when she closed a show for Willie Norris Workshop. Philip has also modeled for Collina Strada's digital runway shows and in the brand's lookbooks. Marc Jacobs has also made Philip one of the designer's closest, most frequent collaborators, working with her on various media projects.  In 2019, Philip made her television debut on TBS's Full Frontal with Samantha Bee. In 2020, Jeremy Scott, creative director of Italian luxury fashion brand Moschino then tapped her as the face of the brand's fall/winter 2020 campaign, shot by photographers Luigi + Iango. In 2021, Philip debuted exclusively for Moschino’s spring/summer 2022 runway show at New York Fashion Week - she is the first model using a wheelchair to walk a runway show for a major luxury fashion brand.

She is currently represented by Community New York and Milk Management London.

Personal life 

Philip was born in Antigua and Barbuda and diagnosed with cerebral palsy as a baby. Philip and her family relocated to the United States when she was only three years old and they have lived in the Bronx, New York, ever since. Philip has been on the internet since a young age, most notably starting on her Tumblr blog 'Aaronverse.' When she was only 12, her blog was noticed by former Tumblr CEO David Karp and she spoke at Tumblr’s headquarters about her blog and living with cerebral palsy.

In 2015, when Philip was 14, she came out as gender-fluid, and had identified as gender nonconforming/non-binary for several years. In 2018, Philip came out as a transgender woman. Philip credits Naomi Campbell and Jillian Mercado as influences who inspired her to become a model and work towards a more inclusive fashion industry.

Recognition 
Philip was listed as part of Teen Vogue's 21 Under 21 for 2018 and 2020.

In 2019, Out magazine named Philip and Teddy Quinlivan as Out100 Models of the Year.

Philip was recognized as a Dazed 100 model in 2019, which recognizes prominent influences in youth culture.

In February 2020, Philip was featured on Beyoncé's website as a part of the "This is Black History" series of #BEYGOOD.

See also
 LGBT culture in New York City
 List of LGBT people from New York City

References

External links
 
Aaron Philip on Twitter

Living people
Transgender writers
Transgender female models
American female models
Models from New York City
People with cerebral palsy
Place of birth missing (living people)
2001 births
Models with disabilities
21st-century LGBT people